Anne Tenney (born 1954) is an Australian film, television and theatre actress, perhaps best known for her soap  opera roles as Melissa "Molly" Jones in the television drama A Country Practice, Liz Taylor in Always Greener and Sal Kerrigan opposite Michael Caton in the major hit film The Castle.

Tenney started her career in guest roles in several Australian drama series, before joining the cast of A Country Practice in 1981. She left the show in 1985.  

She was then to have roles in Police Rescue, Brides of Christ, E Street, Water Rats, Always Greener, All Saints,  headLand and Packed to the RaftersFilmography
Films

Television

Awards
In 1985, Tenney won the 'Most Popular Lead Actress' award at the Logies for her role as Melissa 'Molly Jones' in A Country Practice. Tenney went on to win 'NSW Most Popular Female' and 'Most Popular Australian Actress' in 1986 for the same role.

Personal
Tenney grew up in Sydney, Australia, graduating from Acting at the National Institute of Dramatic Art in 1979. She is married to actor Shane Withington, who played her on screen husband Brenden Jones on A Country Practice''.

References

External links
 

1954 births
Australian television actresses
Australian film actresses
Living people
Logie Award winners
Actresses from Sydney